São Tomé and Príncipe Olympic Committee (IOC code: STP) is the National Olympic Committee representing São Tomé and Príncipe.

See also
 São Tomé and Príncipe at the Olympics

References

São Tomé and Príncipe
São Tomé and Príncipe at the Olympics